Bandu (also Romanized as Bandū) is a village in Markazi Rural District, in the Central District of Dashti County, Bushehr Province, Iran. At the 2006 census, its population was 20, in 4 families.

References 

Populated places in Dashti County